Ah Meng (circa 18 June 1960 – 8 February 2008) (Chinese: 阿明) was a female Sumatran orangutan and a tourism icon of Singapore. Ah Meng was originally from Indonesia and was kept illegally in Singapore as a domestic pet before being recovered by a veterinarian in 1971. She was then eleven years old and was given a home at the Singapore Zoo.

Ah Meng was the head of her small clan, which lives in a large enclosure with about twenty other orangutans. She had five children, twelve grandchildren and five great-grandchildren.

She belonged to the Sumatran orangutan species, a rarer breed of orangutan now critically endangered due to illegal logging and poaching.  There are about only 7,500 Sumatran orangutans left in the wild in the rainforests of Sumatra, Indonesia. Ah Meng died on 8 February 2008.

Life 

Ah Meng was smuggled from Indonesia and kept illegally as a domestic pet before being recovered by a veterinarian in 1971. She was then eleven years old and was given a home at the Singapore Zoo.

Due to her early years being raised by a family, Ah Meng was more approachable by humans than other primates in her clan. Due to her interactive nature, she was the first to host the zoo's 'Breakfast With Ah Meng' programme, whereby visitors would eat their morning meal and then have a photograph taken with the orangutan. By allowing visitors to interact closely with Ah Meng and other orangutans, the Singapore Zoo aims to raise public awareness of the importance of preserving the orangutan's natural habitat as well as of other environmental issues.

Ah Meng was the poster girl of the Singapore Zoo. Pictures of her have been used in Singapore's tourism advertisements worldwide. She has also been featured in over 30 travel films and more than 300 articles. Some of the foreign dignitaries and celebrities that visited Ah Meng included Prince Philip, Michael Jackson and Steve Irwin.

In March 1982, during the shooting of a promotional video at MacRitchie Reservoir, Ah Meng climbed a tree and stayed there for two nights. On her way down, she fell seven stories and broke her right arm.

In 1992, the Singapore Tourism Promotion Board conferred Ah Meng a "Special Tourism Ambassador" award in recognition of her contribution to tourism in Singapore. She was the first non-human recipient of the award. She received a certificate and a stack of bananas.

In March 1992, Ah Meng attacked a French female research student who was studying orangutan behaviour and spent much time with Ah Meng's long-time keeper, Alagappasamy Chellaiyahy.

Ah Meng was specially featured in the Singapore Guide book of 1988, The Singapore Treasury by Andreas and Carola Augustin.

As she aged, her public appearances became less frequent for fear of subjecting her to stress.

Death 
Ah Meng died on 8 February 2008 due to old age. She was 47 years old, and was survived by two sons, Hsing Hsing (who died of diabetic complications at the Perth Zoo in 2017) and Satria, and three daughters, Medan, Hong Bao (Named for the red envelopes given to relatives during Chinese New Year, and the reddish hair orangutans have), and Sayang (a Malay word term similar to darling in English), 12 grandchildren and 5 great-grandchildren

On 10 February 2008, a memorial service for Ah Meng was held before a crowd of 4000 visitors at the Singapore Zoo.

As a tribute to her, the next orangutan born at the Singapore Zoo will be named Ah Meng Junior. A durian tree was planted at her grave because durian was her favourite fruit. A life-sized bronze statue forged in her image was also unveiled. Ishta, Ah Meng's granddaughter, Sayang and Galdikas' daughter, was chosen to take over the namesake of Ah Meng.

See also
Inuka, polar bear mascot of the Singapore Zoo
List of individual apes

References

Tourist attractions in Singapore
Individual orangutans
Singapore Zoo
1960 animal births
2008 animal deaths
Individual animals in Singapore